Hiawatha Lavern Shelby (November 10, 1921 – September 19, 1996) was an American Negro league outfielder in the 1940s.

A native of Indianapolis, Indiana, Shelby played for the Philadelphia Stars in 1941. In eight recorded games, he posted one hit and one RBI in 28 plate appearances. Shelby died in Indianapolis in 1996 at age 74.

References

External links
 and Seamheads

1921 births
1996 deaths
Philadelphia Stars players
20th-century African-American sportspeople